Penpan Sittitrai was Thailand's most famous fruit carving artist and an author. In 2010 she received the honorary title of National Artist for her work. She wrote a book titled The Art of Thai Vegetable and Fruit Carving.

In February 2017 Google has run a Google Doodle in her honor.

References

Penpan Sittitrai
1926 births
2015 deaths